Love in a Veil is a 1718 comedy play by the British writer Richard Savage. It was inspired by a seventeenth century play by the Spanish writer Pedro Calderón de la Barca. The cast included Charles Williams as Lorenzo, Henry Norris as Alonzo, John Mills as Sir Charles Winlove, John Thurmond as Don Philip, William Mills as Diego, Anna Maria Seymour as Leonora, Mary Willis as Fidelia and Joe Miller as Aspin.

References

Bibliography
 Burling, William J. A Checklist of New Plays and Entertainments on the London Stage, 1700-1737. Fairleigh Dickinson Univ Press, 1992.
 Hogan, Floriana Tarantino.The Spanish Comedia and the English Comedy of Intrigue with Special Reference to Aphra Behn. Boston University, 1995.

1718 plays
British plays
West End plays